The French destroyer Foudroyant was one of 14 s built for the French Navy during the 1920s.

Design and description
The L'Adroit class was a slightly enlarged and improved version of the preceding Bourrasque class. They were powered by two geared steam turbines, each driving one propeller shaft, using steam provided by three du Temple boilers.

The main armament of the L'Adroit-class ships consisted of four Canon de 130 mm Modèle 1924 guns in single mounts, one superfiring pair each fore and aft of the superstructure. Their anti-aircraft armament consisted of a pair of Canon de 37 mm Modèle 1925 guns. The ships carried two above-water triple sets of  torpedo tubes. A pair of depth charge chutes were built into their stern; these housed a total of sixteen  depth charges. In addition two depth charge throwers were fitted for which six  depth charges were carried.

Construction and career
Foudroyant was laid down on 28 July 1927, launched on 24 April 1929 and commissioned on 10 October 1930. She was sunk on 1 June 1940 off Dunkirk by German aircraft, whilst assisting in the Dunkirk evacuation.

Wreck located at: .

Notes

References

External links
http://www.uboat.net/allies/warships/ship/6026.html
http://www.wrecksite.eu/wreck.aspx?14

L'Adroit-class destroyers
World War II destroyers of France
1929 ships
Destroyers sunk by aircraft
Ships built by Dyle et Bacalan
Maritime incidents in June 1940
Ships sunk by German aircraft
World War II shipwrecks in the North Sea